

Emergence of Socialist Party
At the beginning of the 20th century, socialism began to develop in the industrial centers.  Although the first socialist party, the Social Democratic League, was founded in the 19th century, the electoral system, combined with a policy of containment and repression, prevented the development of the socialist movement. In the 1901 election, the Social Democratic Workers' Party increased its representation from two to six seats in the lower house of parliament, to the great unease of the confessional and liberal elite. This unease became even greater during the railway strike of 1903, which disrupted the functioning of Dutch society. The railway strike was followed by a general strike in protest at the harsh treatment of the railway workers by the confessional government.  In contrast to Germany, the majority of Dutch socialists did not complain about imperialism and the East Indies.

After the 1913 elections, in which the social democrats doubled their number of seats (from 7 to 15), the Liberal Union tried to form a coalition government with the social democrats but the social democrats refused to cooperate with what they perceived as bourgeois (or "middle class") parties.

World War I

Although its army mobilised when World War I broke out in August 1914, the Netherlands remained a neutral country. The German invasion of Belgium  led to a large flow of refugees from that country (about 1 million). The German Imperial Army however did march through a small part of Dutch territory during the invasion of Belgium, effectively 'taking a shortcut'. The government  accepted this to maintain the neutrality of the Netherlands.

The country being surrounded by states at war, and with the North Sea unsafe for civilian ships to sail on, food became scarce; food was now distributed using coupons. An error in food distribution caused the so-called Aardappeloproer (Potato-rebellion) in Amsterdam in 1917, when civilians plundered a food transport intended for soldiers.

Interwar 
Dutch society became divided among three large ideologies, Protestantism, Roman Catholicism and Socialism, who tried to protect their populations with a system called verzuiling or Pillarization. The small minority of Liberals, though insisting that their "general" organizations were open to all, effectively consisted a fourth pillar that held power through financial, rather than social, strength.

Although both houses of the Dutch parliament were elected by the people, only men with high incomes were eligible for voting. This situation lasted until 1918, when pressure from socialist movements had resulted in elections in which all men were allowed to vote. From 1922 onward, women could vote as well.

The worldwide Great Depression of 1929 and the early 1930s had crippling effects on the Dutch economy, effects which lasted longer than they did in most European countries. The long duration of the Great Depression in the Netherlands is often explained by the very strict fiscal policy of the Dutch government at the time, and its decision to adhere to the Gold Standard much longer than most of its trading partners. The depression led to large unemployment and poverty, as well as increasing social unrest. Riots in a working-class neighbourhood in Amsterdam were put down with army assistance, with fatal consequences (for more details: Great Depression in the Netherlands).

The rise of Nazism in Germany did not go unnoticed in the Netherlands, and there was growing concern over the possibility of armed conflict. However, some say the threat of Nazi aggression was not fully acknowledged by the government of the time. An often mentioned example is a particular statement by prime minister Hendrik Colijn at the end of his radio speech on the occupation of the Rhineland. He stressed that citizens could sleep safely, because there was no reason for concern.

World War II

At the outbreak of World War II in 1939, the Netherlands declared their neutrality again. However, on May 10, 1940, Nazi Germany launched an attack on the Netherlands and Belgium and overran most of the country quickly, fighting against a poorly equipped Dutch army.

By May 14, fighting was only occurring in a few isolated areas, including Rotterdam. That same day, at 10:35am, Nazi Germany demanded, in an ill-formatted ultimatum — it was signed simply "the commanding officer of the troops at Rotterdam", without giving the exact identity of the sender — that the Netherlands surrender the city within two hours, to which the commander in chief, General Henri Winkelman, replied through the garrison commander at 12:15 that only a correctly signed ultimatum would be considered. Around 13:30 a new ultimatum was handed out to a Dutch officer, and a reply was expected before 16:30. However, at the same time the bombardment of Rotterdam began, killing about 800 people and destroying large parts of the city, leaving 78,000 homeless. Following the bombardment and German threats of the same for Utrecht, general Winkelman capitulated.

However, the capitulation affected only the Royal Netherlands Army — not the Royal Netherlands Navy, the air force or the Netherlands East Indies Army, in the Dutch East Indies. In this way, the Netherlands did not cease to exist, which proved of vital importance for the governing of the overseas territories and for keeping the Navy active against Germany. The government, the queen and some military forces fled to Britain, while other members of the royal family fled to Canada.

Nazi Germany's civil administration of the Netherlands was headed by Arthur Seyss-Inquart. Persecution of the Jews, of which about 140,000 lived in the Netherlands at the start of the war, including some 20,000 refugees, started immediately after the invasion. In 1942, a transit camp was erected near Westerbork. Concentration camps were built near Vught and Amersfoort. At the end of the war, only about 20,000 of the 140,000 Dutch Jews remained alive. Anne Frank, who later gained worldwide fame when her diary, written in the Achterhuis, while hiding from the Nazis, was found and published, died shortly before the liberation of her camp on May 5, 1945.

Following the refusal of the Netherlands government-in-exile to allow the sale of oil from the Dutch East Indies to Japan, Japanese forces invaded Dutch territory on January 11, 1942. The Dutch surrendered on March 8, after Japanese troops landed on Java. Dutch citizens were captured and put to work in labour camps. However, many Dutch ships and military personnel managed to reach Australia, from where they were able to fight against the Japanese.

In Europe, after the Allies landed in Normandy in June 1944, they proceeded quickly towards the Dutch border. On September 5 most of the Dutch thought the liberation would be very soon; the day  is known as Dolle Dinsdag (Mad Tuesday). On September 17 a daring operation, Operation Market Garden, was staged to make a quick incursion into the southern Netherlands and capture bridges across the three main rivers. The bridge at Arnhem, across the Rhine, could however not be captured. The part south of the rivers was liberated in the period September - November 1944. However, for most of the country people would have to wait until May 1945.

The winter of 1944-1945 was very harsh, and many Dutch starved, giving the winter the name Hongerwinter (Hunger winter) Dutch famine of 1944–45. Following Allied victories in Nazi Germany and Adolf Hitler's suicide on April 30, 1945, Canadian General Foulkes accepted the surrender of the German troops in the Netherlands at Wageningen on May 5, 1945.

Post-war years

Indonesia

Allied forces liberated parts of the Dutch East Indies in mid-1945.  However the Japanese-installed local leadership declared independence as Indonesia, and controlled the main islands. A confusing phase followed. Its massive oil reserves provided about 14 percent of the prewar Dutch national product and supported a large population of ethnic Dutch government officials and businessmen in Jakarta and other major cities. In 1945, the  Netherlands could not regain these islands on its own; had to depend on British military action and American financial grants. By the time Dutch soldiers returned, an independent government under Sukarno, was in power. The Dutch in the East Indies, and at home, were practically unanimous (except for the Communists) that Dutch power and prestige and wealth depended on an extremely expensive war to regain the islands.   Compromises were negotiated, were trusted by neither side. When the Indonesian Republic successfully suppressed a  large-scale communist revolt, the United States realized that it needed the nationalist government as an ally  in the Cold War.  Dutch possession was an obstacle to American Cold War goals, so Washington forced the Dutch to grant full independence. A few years later, Sukarno seized all Dutch properties and expelled all ethnic Dutch—over 300,000—as well as several hundred thousand ethnic Indonesians who supported the Dutch cause. In the aftermath, the Netherlands prospered greatly in the 1950s and 1960s but nevertheless public opinion was bitterly hostile to the United States for betrayal. Washington remained baffled why the Dutch were so inexplicably enamored of an obviously hopeless cause.  Western New Guinea remained Dutch (until 1961).

Prosperity
Although it was originally expected that the loss of the Indies would lead to an economic downfall, the reverse proved to be true, and in the 1950s and 1960s the Dutch economy experienced a near unprecedented growth - see the post–World War II boom. In fact, the demand for labor was so strong, that immigration was actively encouraged, first from Italy and Spain; then later on, in larger numbers, from Turkey and Morocco. Combined with the immigration from (former) colonies like Indonesia, Surinam and Netherlands Antilles, this meant that the Netherlands was becoming a multicultural country.

The late 1960s and 1970s were the period of the Dutch disease, which means that easy gains from natural gas exports crowded out manufacturing exports and employment.

In the 1960s and 1970s there were great social and cultural changes, such as rapid depillarization a process that involved the gradual decay of the old divisions along class and religious lines (which had led to things like separate education and separate television broadcasts for Catholics, Protestants, socialists and liberals). Youths, and students in particular, rejected the traditional morals and pushed for social change in matters like women's rights, sexuality and environmental issues. Today, the Netherlands is regarded as a very liberal country, considering its drugs policy and its legalisation of euthanasia. Same-sex marriage became permitted on April 1, 2001. At that time, the Netherlands was the only country where gay marriages were not only allowed, but also considered fully equivalent to heterosexual ones.

In 1952, the Netherlands was among the founders of the European Coal and Steel Community (ECSC) (together with France, West Germany, Italy, Belgium and Luxembourg). The ECSC would over time evolve into the European Union. A modern, industrialised nation, the Netherlands is also a large exporter of agricultural products. The country was a founding member of NATO and participated in the introduction of the euro in 1999.

From 1918 to 1967 Dutch politics were dominated by the Christian Democrat parties, which were members of every government, sometimes in coalition with the liberal party, sometimes with the social democrats. This changed in 1994, when social-democrats and liberals formed the so-called "Purple Cabinet", which governed until 2002.

21st century
Since 2002, the Dutch governments has mostly been led by Christian-democrats and liberals interchangeably.

On May 6, 2002, the murder of Pim Fortuyn, a right-wing populist calling for a very strict policy on immigration, shocked the country. His party became a major political force after the elections, significantly changing the political landscape. However, lack of leadership and fighting within the party caused them to lose much of their following in elections the next year. Another political murder took place on November 2, 2004, when film director and publicist Theo van Gogh was assassinated by a Dutch-Moroccan Islamic extremist. This sparked debate about Islamic extremism in the Netherlands, and on immigration and integration (or lack thereof) as well.

In 2017, the government consists of the People's Party for Freedom and Democracy (VVD), The Christian Democratic Appeal (CDA), Democrats 66 (D66) and The Christian Union (CU).

In March 2021, centre-right VVD of Prime Minister Mark Rutte was the winner of the elections, securing 35 out of 150 seats. The second biggest party was the centre-left D66 with 24 seats. Geert Wilders' far-right party lost its support. Prime Minister Mark Rutte, in power since 2010, formed his fourth coalition government.

See also
2005 Dutch European Constitution referendum
Referendums in the Netherlands

References

Further reading
 Kennedy, James C. A Concise History of the Netherlands (Cambridge UP, 2017).
 Kossmann,  E. H. The Low Countries 1780-1940 (Oxford History of Modern Europe, 1978).
 van Dijk, Ruud and Samuël Kruizinga. Shaping the International Relations of the Netherlands, 1815-2000: A Small Country on the Global Scene (2018)
 Wielenga, Friso. A history of the Netherlands: from the sixteenth century to the present day (2015).

20th century in the Netherlands
21st century in the Netherlands